Arthur Lynch may refer to:

 Arthur Lynch (American football) (born 1990), American football player
 Arthur Lynch (politician) (1861–1934), Irish-Australian physician, soldier and nationalist MP
 Arthur Lynch (mayor) (died 1507), mayor of Galway 1507
 Arthur Lynch fitz Andrew (died 1540), mayor of Galway 1539–40
 Arthur Lynch, character in Person of Interest (TV series)

See also